Calvin A. Johnson Jr. (born November 21, 1985) is an American saxophonist, bandleader, composer, producer, and actor from New Orleans, Louisiana, United States. A multi-instrumentalist, he is best known as a tenor and soprano saxophone player but also performs and records on alto and baritone saxophones, clarinet, and flute. Johnson has worked with many of the biggest names in New Orleans music, including Aaron Neville, Harry Connick Jr., the Dirty Dozen Brass Band, Mystikal, Irvin Mayfield, Mannie Fresh, and others. Johnson is the nephew of New Orleans clarinetist Ralph Johnson, a longtime member of the Preservation Hall Jazz Band. Johnson began playing saxophone at the age of seven, and since 2008 has been playing with his own band, Calvin Johnson & Native Son. In 2015, he started a new band with Dirty Dozen Brass Band founding member and sousaphone player, Kirk Joseph, called Chapter:SOUL.

Life and career
Johnson was born in New Orleans. He grew up in the Black Pearl neighborhood and in New Orleans East. His uncle Lionel Johnson gave him his first saxophone at the age of seven. Johnson's grandfather, George Augustus "Son" Johnson, and uncles Lionel, Alfred, and Ralph Johnson, were all New Orleans jazz musicians. At the age of twelve, Johnson played his first professional gig at Tipitina's French Quarter location with the New Orleans Jazz Babyz, a youth all-star band led by Troy “Trombone Shorty” Andrews and Omari Neville (son of Cyril and Gaynielle Neville).

Johnson studied at the New Orleans Jazz and Heritage Foundation’s School of Music and the Louis Armstrong Summer Jazz Camp under his longtime mentor, Edward "Kidd" Jordan. He graduated in 2003 from the New Orleans Center for Creative Arts (NOCCA), then under the direction of the late Clyde Kerr Jr. His classmates included Troy "Trombone Shorty" Andrews, Jonathan Batiste, and Christian Scott.

After graduating from NOCCA, Johnson enrolled at Dillard University and the University of New Orleans, where he obtained his undergraduate degree in finance.
 
Johnson released his debut album Jewel's Lullaby in 2012 through his own label, Alma Records. In 2013, Johnson released his second album, Native Son, through ThreadHead Records and with support from the Ellis Marsalis Center for Music in the New Orleans Musicians' Village. In addition to his albums recorded as bandleader, Johnson can be heard as a sideman on the following albums: Big Sam’s Funky Nation's Peace, Love, and Understanding, Irvin Mayfield's Strange Fruit, Courtney Bryan's This Little Light of Mine, and others.

Johnson has toured with Harry Connick Jr., Aaron Neville, Irvin Mayfield, the Dirty Dozen Brass Band, Bob French and the Original Tuxedo Jazz Band, Big Sam's Funky Nation. Johnson has performed and recorded with hip hop producer Mannie Fresh and rapper Mystikal. He has performed at many esteemed venues and festivals, including Jazz at Lincoln Center, the White House, the Kodak Theatre, the New Orleans Jazz and Heritage Festival (as both a bandleader and sideman), the French Quarter Festival, Satchmo SummerFest and the Voodoo Music Festival.

Johnson’s acting career began with appearances on the HBO series Treme (TV series) in 2012. Johnson's first feature-length film acting role is that of Frank Lewis in director Dan Pritzker's film Bolden!, which depicts the life of New Orleans cornetist Buddy Bolden.

In August 2015, Johnson started a new funk band, Chapter:SOUL, with Kirk Joseph of the Dirty Dozen Brass Band.

In December 2015, Johnson produced a benefit concert for New Orleans Area Habitat for Humanity (NOAHH), at Trinity Episcopal Church in the Lower Garden District neighborhood of New Orleans. The concert was titled Calvin Johnson with Strings: Winter Wonder Jam.

Johnson serves as a faculty member of the Louis Armstrong Summer Jazz Camp. He also has the pleasure of sitting on the Board of Directors of MaCCNO (Music and Culture Coalition of New Orleans), and in 2015 served as chairmen of NOCCA's (New Orleans Center for Creative Arts) annual spring gala. He is also currently producing a documentary film about New Orleans musical traditions, called TRAD.

Discography

As Bandleader
 Native Son, Threadhead Records, 2013 
 Jewel's Lullaby, Alma Records, 2012

Appearances
Johnson appears as a sideman on
 2010: This Little Light of Mine - Courtney Bryan
 2008: Peace, Love and Understanding - Big Sam's Funky Nation 
 2005: Strange Fruit, Irvin Mayfield & the New Orleans Jazz Orchestra (Basin Street Records)

Filmography and TV appearances

As Actor
 Bolden! (2015) (as Frank Lewis)
 Treme, HBO - Episode #3.10, "Tipitina" (2012)

As Director/Producer
 TRAD (forthcoming)

References

External links
 calvinjohnsonmusic.com
 chaptersoul.com

 http://www.bestofneworleans.com/blogofneworleans/archives/2015/01/12/new-orleans-jazz-and-heritage-festival-2015-schedule-announced 
 https://web.archive.org/web/20150330014343/http://www.wwoz.org/blog/321471 
 http://www.noladefender.com/content/french-quarter-fest-insider
 https://web.archive.org/web/20150413175705/http://lineup.nojazzfest.com/band/calvin-johnson 
 http://www.cdbaby.com/cd/CourtneyBryan1
 http://www.discogs.com/Irvin-Mayfield-With-New-Orleans-Jazz-OrchestraAnd-Dillard-University-Choir-Strange-Fruit/release/5390082 
 http://www.axs.com/calvin-johnson-is-a-musical-force-to-be-reckoned-with-at-jazz-fest-10026 
 http://www.uno.edu/news/2013/UNOAlumnusandTenorSaxophonistCalvinJohnsonJrPerformsattheOgdenMuseumofSouthernArt.aspx 
 https://www.imdb.com/title/tt0858419/fullcredits?ref_=tt_ov_st_sm
 https://www.imdb.com/title/tt1279972/fullcredits?ref_=tt_cl_sm#cast
 
 Wyckoff, G. (2014) Offbeat Magazine. Retrieved April 13, 2015, from http://www.offbeat.com/music/calvin-johnson-jr-native-son-alma-records/ 
 Spera, K. (2015) The Times Picayune NOLA.Com. Retrieved April 13, 2015, from http://www.nola.com/fqfest/index.ssf/2015/04/french_quarter_festival_2015_f_5.html 
 Irrerra, J. (2015) Offbeat Magazine. Retrieved April 13, 2015, from http://www.offbeat.com/articles/french-quarter-fest-2015-z/ 
 Carlon, M. (2015) JazzTimes Magazine.  Retrieved April 13, 2015, from http://jazztimes.com/articles/17669-about-jazztimes 
 Selig, A. (Feb 22, 2015). Northwest Catholic event marks Black History Month. West Hartford News. Retrieved from http://www.westhartfordnews.com/articles/2015/02/22/news/doc54e5350882aba341708648.txt 
 Big Sam's Funky Nation (Musical group). (2008). Peace, love & understanding. New Orleans, La.?: Big Sam's Funky Nation.  Retrieved From https://www.worldcat.org/search?q=Peace%2C+love+and+Understanding&dblist=638&fq=yr%3A2008&qt=facet_yr%3A#x0%253Amusic-%2C%2528x0%253Amusic%2Bx4%253Acd%2529format 
 Mayfield, I., Pierce, W., New Orleans Jazz Orchestra., & Dillard University. (2005). Strange fruit. New Orleans: Basin Street. Retrieved from https://www.worldcat.org/title/strange-fruit/oclc/60677292&referer=brief_results 
 www.Calvinjohnson.me
 www.calvinjohnsonmusic.com

1985 births
Musicians from New Orleans
Living people
University of New Orleans alumni